Comptonia may refer to:
 Comptonia (plant), a monotypic genus in the family Myricaceae
 Comptonia (sea star), an extinct genus of echinoderms in the family Goniasteridae